Gold is a compilation album by American rock band Jefferson Starship, released on Grunt Records in 1979. It collects the band's four Top 40 hit singles from the 1970s, as well as three additional singles that charted on the Billboard Hot 100, a single that missed the chart, one b-side, and one album track. All tracks were also featured on their four studio albums to date: Dragon Fly from 1974; Red Octopus from 1975; Spitfire from 1976; and Earth from 1978. It peaked at No. 20 on the Billboard 200, and has been certified a gold record by the RIAA.

The original vinyl album comprised either album or single versions of individual tracks; for instance, the versions of "Miracles," "Love Too Good" and "Runaway" were the single versions and not the album versions. Early pressings of the album on compact disc repeated this, but 1998 reissue included the full album tracks from Red Octopus and Earth. The original record release also contained a 7-inch 45 RPM bonus single, "Light the Sky on Fire", that was recorded for Star Wars Holiday Special. That and its b-side "Hyperdrive" from Dragon Fly were included on the 1998 RCA reissue as tracks six and twelve.  The album was re-released on gatefold vinyl on Record Store Day, April 13, 2019, with 5,500 copies.  The album is on gold vinyl and contains the mixes from the original vinyl, including the single edits of "Miracles," "Love Too Good," and "Runaway."  Like the original, the release includes a 7" 45 RPM vinyl of "Light the Sky on Fire" b/w "Hyperdrive."

Track listing

Personnel
Paul Kantner – vocals, rhythm guitar 
Grace Slick – vocals
Marty Balin – vocals all tracks except "Ride the Tiger" and "Hyperdrive"
David Freiberg – keyboards on "Ride the Tiger," "Caroline," "Miracles," "Light the Sky on Fire," "With Your Love," "St. Charles," and "Runaway"; bass on "Play on Love," "Count on Me," and "Love Too Good"; backing vocals
Craig Chaquico – lead guitar, backing vocals
Pete Sears – bass on "Ride the Tiger," "Caroline," "Miracles," "Fast Buck Freddie," "Light the Sky on Fire," "With Your Love," "St. Charles," "Runaway," and "Hyperdrive"; keyboards on "Caroline," "Miracles," "St. Charles," "Love Too Good," "Count on Me," and "Hyperdrive"
John Barbata – drums, percussion, backing vocals
Papa John Creach – electric violin on "Ride the Tiger," "Play on Love," "Fast Buck Freddie," and "Hyperdrive"
Steven Schuster – clarinet on "Light the Sky on Fire"

Production
Jefferson Starship – producer
Larry Cox – producer
Pat Ieraci (Maurice) – production coordinator
Bill Thompson – manager
Jacky Kaukonen – managerial director
Bill Laudner – road manager
Cynthia Bowman – publicity
Heidi Howell – publicity
Lora Lovrien – assisting assistant
Adryan Havelka – publishing expert
Paul Dowell – equipment manager
Jeff Baum, Jim Coe, Jim Hill, Skip Johnson, Dave Mairs, Doug McGuire – Starship crew
Mike Fischer – trucking
John Golden – mastering at Kendun Recorders, Burbank
Tim Bryant / Gribbitt! – art direction
Tim Bryant, George Corsillo / Gribbitt! – album design
Annie Leibovitz – photography

References

1979 compilation albums
Grunt Records compilation albums
Jefferson Starship albums